"This Christmas / More Than Love" is a single by Sweetbox from the album After the Lights with Jade Villalon as a frontwoman.

Track listing

Sources

Sweetbox songs
2004 singles
2004 songs
Songs written by Jade Villalon